Baltimore Marriott Waterfront Hotel is a high-rise hotel building, located in the Harbor East area of Baltimore, Maryland. The hotel has been the tallest hotel structure in Baltimore since it opened in 2001 as one of the first structures in Harbor East. The construction of the building was completed in 2001 by the developers of Beatty Harvey Fillat Architects. Beginning on November 16, 2007, management of the hotel began renovations of the building's rooms, which ended on May 25, 2008.

See also
List of tallest buildings in Baltimore

References

External links
Official website
Drawings of the Baltimore Marriott Waterfront Hotel

Hotel buildings completed in 2001
Inner Harbor East, Baltimore
Skyscraper hotels in Baltimore
Hotels established in 2001
2001 establishments in Maryland